Voluta ebraea, common name the Hebrew volute, is a species of medium-sized sea snail, a marine gastropod mollusk in the family Volutidae, the volutes. The Hebrew volute is endemic to Brazil, where it is collected both for food and for its shell, which is highly desired for ornamental purposes. Recent studies indicate that natural populations of Voluta ebraea may be suffering declines due to overfishing and overexploitation.

Distribution
This sea snail is found only along the north and northeastern Brazilian coast in the littoral zone. This species is endemic to those areas. It is present in many Brazilian states and regions, including Pará, Maranhão, Ceará, Rio Grande do Norte, Paraíba, Pernambuco, Alagoas, Sergipe, Bahia and Abrolhos Marine National Park.

Shell description

The shell length of this species may reach and exceed 200 mm, up to 220 mm, although lengths from 100 mm to 150 mm are more common.

Voluta ebraea has a somewhat robust and solid shell, with a slightly elongate contour. It is colored cream externally, with a complex series of darker-reddish brown markings and lines that are said to resemble Hebraic figures. The interior of the shell can vary in color from pale to strong orange. The protoconch is rounded, and presents two whorls. The shell as a whole has seven slightly convex whorls. Those whorls (including the body whorl) are ornamented by several posteriorly-oriented sharp spines. The outer lip is thick, and the aperture is relatively long and narrow. As is the case in other volutes, the columella presents an array of strong oblique columellar folds (also known as plicae, 9 to 11 of them in this species), which are more conspicuous anteriorly. The corneous, claw-like operculum partially covers the shell aperture.

Sexual dimorphism can be observed in the shells of this species: the shells of the males tend to be more elongate with a smoother outer surface, whereas the shells of the females are generally wider and more nodulose. The angle of the spire also differs between males and females.

Anatomy
The Hebrew volute has a pale ivory colored body, ornamented by numerous irregular and intertwined thin dark-red to brown colored lines, and several small spots of the same color along the sides of the foot. Some of the most distinct external features are its very large foot, and a long siphon.

This species presents a Steoglossan type radula, composed of a single row of rachidian or central teeth. Each one of these teeth exhibits several smaller acute denticles or cusps. The radula is considered to be similar, though larger than that of the music volute, a similar but distinct species.

Ecology
Much is yet to be revealed about the ecology of V. ebraea, as studies on that subject are fairly recent and/or rather scarce.

Habitat
The Hebrew volute dwells in sandy bottoms, among coral and rocks, and usually shows a preference for sandy substrata. It may be found from shallow water to depths around 40–70 m and is commonly taken by shrimp trawlers.

Life cycle
Like other members of the clade Neogastropoda, Voluta ebraea is dioecious, which means each individual organism belonging to this species is distinctly male or female. It is also sexually dimorphic, which means there is a difference in form between individuals of different sex within this species.

Feeding habits
As is the case in several other volutids, the Hebrew volute is carnivorous and predatory. It is known to feed on the cardiid bivalve mollusk Trachycardium muricatum in the wild, whereas in captivity it has been reported to feed on the sea snails Stramonita haemastoma (a muricid carnivorous gastropod) and Tegula viridula (a top snail).

Biological interactions
The Hebrew volute is known to be a prey of the Bocon toadfish, Anphichthys cryptocentrus.

Human use
The flesh of Voluta ebraea is edible, and it is locally collected for food in many areas. Its shell is also considered a popular and beautiful decorative object, and is sold as souvenir in local markets and craft stores in several regions of Brazil.

Conservation
Though little is known about the conservation status of this species, it is believed that both overfishing and overexploitation are exerting a negative effect on natural populations. The Hebrew volute may occur in shallow water, which tends to facilitate its harvesting by the locals. Thus it is currently not observed in many areas in which it was known to be numerous before. It is not uncommon for Hebrew volutes to be accidentally caught in bottom gill fishing nets and traps set by commercial fishing boats.

The imposex phenomenon has been observed in the Voluta ebraea. The development of masculine sexual organs in the females exposed to organic tin compounds, such as tributyltin (TBT), may have several negative consequences for entire populations of this species, from sterilization of individuals to the complete extinction of those populations. Such compounds are biocide and antifouling agents, commonly mixed in paints to prevent marine encrustations on boats and ships. Therefore, it is not uncommon for high concentrations of such compounds to be present in the sea water near shipyards and docking areas, consequently exposing the nearby marine life to its deleterious effects.

References

External links

 Femorale
 

Volutidae
Gastropods described in 1758
Taxa named by Carl Linnaeus
Endemic fauna of Brazil